Victoria Airport is an airport serving the town of Victoria in Yoro Department, Honduras. The airport is adjacent to the southwest side of the town.

There is mountainous terrain north through southeast of the airport, and rising terrain in other quadrants.

See also

Transport in Honduras
List of airports in Honduras

References

External links
 OpenStreetMap - Victoria
 HERE Maps - Victoria
 OurAirports - Victoria Airport
 

Airports in Honduras